Anund Priyay Neewoor (born 26 June 1940) is a Mauritian diplomat. As of the year 2006, he has served as Foreign Secretary.
On  he was appointed Mauritian Ambassador to the United States where he was accredited from  till .

References

1940 births
Living people
Mauritian diplomats
Permanent Representatives of Mauritius to the United Nations
Ambassadors of Mauritius to the United States